The following is a list of awards and honors awarded to Wesley Clark. These include awards and decorations of the United States Army, civilian awards, international honors, and knighthoods.

Awards and honors

U.S. Military decorations
Each "Oak Leaf Cluster" or "Service Star" denotes an additional bestowal of the same award or in the case of some campaign medals, one campaign star is awarded.

Civilian awards

Knighthoods
The United States Constitution prohibits government officials from accepting titles of nobility from foreign governments without Congressional approval, but no such prohibition exists on private citizens.  However, the Foreign Gifts and Decorations Act gave such approval in certain circumstances, subject to the approval of "the employing agency." The following are inductions into orders that are categorized as orders of knighthood or chivalry, or orders in which knight is the lowest rank:

Other Foreign Honors

References

Lists of awards received by person